Triumph is an unincorporated community located just east of Interstate 39 in LaSalle County, Illinois, United States. Students in Triumph attend nearby Mendota public schools. The village is home to one restaurant and is known for its curling club. The community has many farms surrounding it and contains fewer than 100 people.

History
Triumph was so named when supporters of establishing a post office "triumphed" over those who opposed it. The Triumph post office has been in operation since 1857. The Chicago Northwestern Railroad established a depot in Triumph around 1900. It stood until roughly 1950.

References

Unincorporated communities in Illinois
Ottawa, IL Micropolitan Statistical Area
Unincorporated communities in LaSalle County, Illinois
1857 establishments in Illinois
Populated places established in 1857